Aivar Rosenberg (born 14 September 1962 in Tartu) is an Estonian politician. He was a member of XII Riigikogu.

He has been a member of Estonian Reform Party.

In 2006, he was awarded with Order of the White Star, V class.

References

Living people
1962 births
Estonian Reform Party politicians
Members of the Riigikogu, 2011–2015
Recipients of the Order of the White Star, 5th Class
Politicians from Tartu